Diory Hernández (born April 8, 1984) is a Dominican professional baseball infielder who is currently a free agent. He played in Major League Baseball (MLB) for the Atlanta Braves from 2009 to 2011.

Career

Atlanta Braves
Hernández was promoted to Atlanta from Triple-A Gwinnett after hitting .355 (39-for-110) with 12 doubles in 29 games to replace an injured Omar Infante.

On August 2, 2010 Hernández was promoted to Atlanta from Triple-A Gwinnett to replace injured second baseman Martín Prado.

As of April 7, 2011, Hernández was the starting second baseman for the Gwinnett Braves.

On July 29, 2011, Hernández was designated for assignment.

Houston Astros
The Houston Astros signed Hernandez to a minor league contract on December 1, 2011. He also received an invitation to spring training. He was released later in the year.

Chicago Cubs
The Chicago Cubs signed Hernandez to a minor league contract on May 25, 2012. He elected free agency on November 2, 2012.

Piratas de Campeche
On March 21, 2013, Hernandez signed with the Piratas de Campeche of the Mexican Baseball League. He was released on June 4, 
2013.

Rieleros de Aguascalientes
On June 16, 2015, Hernandez signed with the Rieleros de Aguascalientes of the Mexican Baseball League.

Rojos del Águila de Veracruz
On July 9, 2015, Hernandez was traded to the Rojos del Águila de Veracruz of the Mexican Baseball League. He was released on October 21, 2015.

Return to Aguascalientes
On January 27, 2016, Hernandez signed with the Rieleros de Aguascalientes of the Mexican Baseball League. He was released on May 14, 2017.

Vaqueros Unión Laguna
On June 3, 2017, Hernandez signed with the Vaqueros Unión Laguna of the Mexican Baseball League. He was released on June 26, 2017.

Saraperos de Saltillo
On April 16, 2018, Hernandez signed with the Saraperos de Saltillo of the Mexican Baseball League. He was released on July 2, 2018.

References

External links

1984 births
Atlanta Braves players
Dominican Republic expatriate baseball players in Mexico
Dominican Republic expatriate baseball players in the United States
Cañeros de Los Mochis players
Gulf Coast Braves players
Gwinnett Braves players
Iowa Cubs players

Leones del Escogido players
Living people
Major League Baseball players from the Dominican Republic
Major League Baseball second basemen
Major League Baseball shortstops
Major League Baseball third basemen
Mexican League baseball first basemen
Mexican League baseball right fielders
Mexican League baseball second basemen
Mexican League baseball third basemen
Mississippi Braves players
Myrtle Beach Pelicans players
Oklahoma City RedHawks players
Sportspeople from San Pedro de Macorís
Piratas de Campeche players
Richmond Braves players
Rieleros de Aguascalientes players
Rojos del Águila de Veracruz players
Rome Braves players
Toros del Este players
Tigres del Licey players
Vaqueros Unión Laguna players
Saraperos de Saltillo players